Ankofabe is a town and commune in Madagascar. It belongs to the district of Maroantsetra, which is a part of Analanjirofo Region. The population of the commune was estimated to be approximately 10,561 in 2018.

Primary and junior level secondary education are available in town. The majority 95% of the population of the commune are farmers.  The most important crops are rice and vanilla, while other important agricultural products are coffee and cloves.  Services provide employment for 5% of the population.

References and notes 

Populated places in Analanjirofo